The women's cycling omnium at the 2012 Olympic Games in London took place at the London Velopark on 6 and 7 August 2012.

Laura Trott from Great Britain, the reigning World and European champion in the event, won the gold medal. Sarah Hammer from the United States took silver and Australia's Annette Edmondson won the bronze.

Competition format
The competition consisted of six events, with a point-for-place system.

 Points race: a  points race, with scoring for intermediate sprints as well as for lapping the pack.
 Elimination race: a "miss-and-out" elimination race, with the last rider in every sprint (each two laps) eliminated.
 Individual pursuit: a  individual pursuit, with placing based on time.
 Scratch race: a  scratch race, with all riders competing at once and first across the line winning.
 Time trial: a  time trial, with two riders (starting opposite the track) riding at once.

Schedule
All times are British Summer Time

Overall results

FL: Flying lap. PR: Points race. ER: Elimination race.
IP: 3000m individual pursuit. SR: Scratch race. TT: 500m time trial.

Event results

Flying lap

Points race

Elimination race

Individual pursuit

Scratch race

Time trial

References

Track cycling at the 2012 Summer Olympics
Cycling at the Summer Olympics – Women's omnium
Olymp
Women's events at the 2012 Summer Olympics